Du Qian is a fictional character in Water Margin, one of the Four Great Classical Novels in Chinese literature. Nicknamed "Touching the Sky", he ranks 83rd among the 108 Stars of Destiny and 47th among the 72 Earthly Fiends.

Background
When Liangshan Marsh is first mentioned in Water Margin, it is occupied by bandits led by Wang Lun, Du Qian and Song Wan. Before coming to this water-locked place, Wang and Du apparently had been drifting around together and were once sheltered by the nobleman Chai Jin. After setting up a stronghold at Liangshan, they expand their band to about 800 men. Wang Lun takes the place of chief, with Du Qian as his top assistant. Song Wan subsequently joins them and takes the third position.

Lin Chong joins Liangshan 
Du Qian, along with Wang Lun and Song Wan, is first mentioned when the nobleman Chai Jin suggests to the former imperial troops instructor Lin Chong, who has killed three men sent by Grand Marshal Gao Qiu to murder him in Cangzhou, that he could take refuge in Liangshan. However, when Lin Chong arrives at the stronghold, Wang Lun is worried that Lin, a good fighter, would usurp his place. He tries to send him away with gifts and excuses. But Du Qian, Song Wan and Zhu Gui, who runs an outlying inn which acts as a lookout for Liangshan, pleads on Lin's behalf. Wang Lun eventually allows Lin Chong to stay but keeps him at a low position.

Chao Gai becomes chief
Later Chao Gai and his six robber friends, wanted for hijacking valuables in transportation to Grand Tutor Cai Jing in the imperial capital Dongjing, seek refuge in Liangshan. Again, Wang Lun fears that the group would pose a threat and tries to send them away with gifts and excuses. Wu Yong instigates the disgruntled Lin Chong to kill Wang. Du Qian, Song Wan and Zhu Gui are restrained by the others from interfering. Knowing that they are no match for the group, the three passively witness Wang being killed. They then transfer their loyalty to Chao, accepting him as Liangshan's chief. However, they are relegated to the last three positions.

Campaigns and death
Du Qian is appointed as one of the leaders of the Liangshan infantry after the 108 Stars of Destiny came together in what is called the Grand Assembly. He participates in the campaigns against the Liao invaders and rebel forces in Song territory following amnesty from Emperor Huizong for Liangshan.

In the battle of Qingxi County (清溪縣; present-day Chun'an County, Zhejiang) in the campaign against Fang La, Du Qian is trampled to death by the enemy cavalry. After the campaign ended, he is conferred the posthumous title of "Righteous Gentleman of Integrity" (義節郎).

References
 
 
 
 
 
 
 

72 Earthly Fiends